Trengereid is a local stop on the Bergen Line. It is located far east in Bergen, Norway, in the Arna borough on the shore of the fjord Sørfjord.

Overview 

The station was opened when the Bergen-Voss railway line Vossebanen was opened in 1883.

To the south of the station, up on the mountain slope, is the small Trengereid residential neighborhood.  Below the station, facing the fjord on the north are the old Trengereid factories, service buildings and docking facilities.

The station is served by all local trains running between Voss and Bergen's main railway station, but express trains do not stop here.

The track layout at Trengereid is somewhat unusual.  Originally, the station had only a single track, the topography at the site, with a steep slope to the south and a body of water to the north, made it difficult to add a second track.  The line eastwards went in a curve around the mountain shelf.  In 1955 a second track was added at the station by building a tunnel on the east side of the station, this became the main line. The station has two platforms, but only the platform next to the tunnel, where trains can stop without blocking the single track part of the platform, is in use for embarking and disembarking.  The station building was designed by Balthazar Lange.

References

External links 
 Jernbaneverket's entry on Trengereid
 Map of station area (gulesider.no)

Railway stations on Bergensbanen
Railway stations in Bergen
Railway stations opened in 1883